A strange star is a hypothetical astronomical object, a quark star made of strange quark matter.

Strange stars might exist without regard to the Bodmer–Witten assumption of stability at near-zero temperatures and pressures, as strange quark matter might form and remain stable at the core of neutron stars, in the same way as ordinary quark matter could. Such strange stars will naturally have a crust layer of neutron star material. The depth of the crust layer will depend on the physical conditions and circumstances of the entire star and on the properties of strange quark matter in general. Stars partially made up of quark matter (including strange quark matter) are also referred to as hybrid stars.

The collapse of the crust layer of strange stars is one of the proposed causes of fast radio bursts.

Theoretical description

Neutron stars are formed when the collapse of a star occurs with such intense force that gravity forces subatomic particles such as protons and electrons to merge into neutrally charged neutron particles, releasing a shower of neutrinos. If the resultant neutral core is able to maintain form and not collapse into a black hole, the end result is an incredibly dense celestial body composed entirely of neutral charged particles. 

The conditions within a neutron star are so dense that currently understood laws of physics seem to no longer apply – including the strong nuclear force which governs subatomic interactions. Protons and neutrons are composed of three quarks: a proton by two up quarks and one down quark, a neutron by two down quarks and one up quark. It is hypothesized that within neutron stars, the conditions are so extreme that a process known as deconfinement occurs: where subatomic particles dissolve and leave their constituent quarks behind as free particles. The temperature and pressure would then force these quarks to be squeezed together to such an extent that they would form a hypothetical phase of matter known as quark matter. If this occurs, the neutron star becomes a "quark star". If the pressure is great enough, the quarks could be affected even further and transform into strange quarks, which would then interact with the other "non-strange" quarks to form strange matter. If this occurs, the quark star would then become a strange star.

Characteristics
Recent theoretical research has found the mechanisms by which the quark stars with "strange quark nuggets" may decrease the objects' electric fields and the densities from previous theoretical expectations, causing such stars to appear nearly indistinguishable from ordinary neutron stars. This suggests that many, or even all, known neutron stars might be the strange stars. However, the investigating team of Jaikumar, Reddy, and Steiner (2006) made some fundamental assumptions that led to uncertainties in their results significant enough that the question is not settled. More research, both observational and theoretical, remains to be done on strange stars in the future.

Other theoretical work contends that:
Addressing key parameters like surface tension and electrical forces that were neglected in the original study, the results show that as long as the surface tension is below a low critical value, the large strangelets are indeed unstable to fragmentation and strange stars naturally come with complex strangelet crusts, analogous to those of neutron stars.

Crust collapse
For a strange star's crust to collapse, it must accrete matter from its environment in some form.

The release of even small amounts of its matter causes a cascading effect on the star's crust. This is thought to result in a massive release of magnetic energy as well as electron and positron pairs in the initial phases of the collapsing stage. This release of high energy particles and magnetic energy in such a short period of time causes the newly released electron/positron pairs to be directed towards the poles of the strange star due to the increased magnetic energy created by the initial secretion of the strange star's matter. Once these electron / positron pairs are directed to the star's poles, they are then ejected at relativistic velocities, which is proposed to be one of the causes of FRBs.

Primordial strange stars
Theoretical investigations have revealed that quark stars might not only be produced from neutron stars and powerful supernovae, they could also be created in the early cosmic phase separations following the Big Bang.

If these primordial quark stars can transform into strange quark matter before the external temperature and pressure conditions of the early universe renders them unstable, they might become stable, if the Bodmer–Witten assumption holds true. Such primordial strange stars could survive to this day.

Observability
Strange dwarfs, unlike neutron stars with strange cores, are postulated to be different from white dwarfs.  A database of white dwarfs has been analyzed. Knowledge of the mass and surface gravity of a star, allows calculation of its radius. A team that compared 40,000 white dwarfs to the mass-radius relation for white dwarfs  discovered that most of them followed that relation. Eight exceptions were much smaller in size and matched predictions for a strange dwarf.

See also
Stellar classification

References

Further reading
  – Original scientific paper source

 – Simpler breakdown of said scientific paper.

Quark stars
Hypothetical stars
Exotic matter
Strange quark